King Stingray are an Australian rock band from Northeast Arnhem Land in the Northern Territory. With a sound self-described as "Yolŋu surf rock", the band perform songs with lyrics in both English and Yolŋu Matha. King Stingray released their debut single, "Hey Wanhaka", in October 2020, and their self-titled debut album on 5 August 2022.

Career
Two of the band's founding members have known one another since childhood – lead vocalist Yirrŋa Yunupiŋu is the nephew of Dr M. Yunupiŋu, and guitarist Roy Kellaway is the son of Stuart Kellaway, who were both founding members of Yothu Yindi. The pair grew up together in Yolngu country, in the community of Yirrkala. They were joined by guitarist/didgeridoo player Dimathaya Burarrwanga and bassist Campbell Messer to form King Stingray in 2020.

King Stingray's debut single, "Hey Wanhaka", written by Yirrnga Yunupiŋu and Roy Kellaway, was released in October 2020.

In January 2021, King Stingray released "Get Me Out"; a song described by Double J as "a tribute to the importance of home". According to a press statement, the song was written following a family member of the band getting lost in Melbourne when they were on tour with Yothu Yindi. The band said: "She had no phone, [and] Yolŋu style, she navigated her way back to us miraculously and we now laugh about it." Dan Condon from the ABC said "It's as catchy as it is stirring and will no doubt help this new band continue to win the hearts of a broad range of music lovers." Lewis Stiles joined on drums in early 2021.

In August 2021, King Stingray released "Milkumana"; a song described by triple j as being "about the power of passing on knowledge". The music video was filmed in the band's hometown of Yirrkala, and features tribal elders Mangatjay Yunupingu and Malŋay Yunupingu. In January 2022, both "Milkumana" and "Get Me Out" charted in the triple j Hottest 100 at number 56 and 46, respectively.

In March 2022, King Stingray released "Camp Dog". The title refers to the dogs that wander the streets of Yirrkala. The following month, the band supported Midnight Oil at the latter's final headlining show in Sydney on their Resist tour. In May 2022, King Stingray released the single "Let's Go" and announced their debut self-titled album. The album was released on 5 August 2022.

In October 2022, King Stingray released a cover of Men at Work's "Down Under" as part of a new campaign for Tourism Australia.<ref name="Down Under">{{cite web|url=https://www.nme.com/en_au/news/music/king-stingray-share-cover-of-men-at-works-down-under-3330767|title= King Stingray share cover of Men At Works 'Down Under'|website=NME|date=18 October 2022|access-date=24 October 2022|author=Disalvo, Tom}}</ref>

Band members
 Yirrŋa Yunupiŋu – lead vocals, clapsticks
 Roy Kellaway – guitar, backing vocals
 Dimathaya Burarrwanga – guitar, backing vocals, didgeridoo
 Campbell Messer – bass, banjo, backing vocals
 Yimila Gurruwiwi – didgeridoo, backing vocals
 Lewis Stiles – drums, backing vocals

Discography
Studio albums

Singles

Awards and nominations
AIR Awards
The Australian Independent Record Awards (commonly known informally as AIR Awards) is an annual awards night to recognise, promote and celebrate the success of Australia's Independent Music sector.

! 
|-
| 2022
| "Get Me Out"
| Independent Song of the Year
| 
| 

APRA Awards
The APRA Awards are presented annually from 1982 by the Australasian Performing Right Association (APRA), "honouring composers and songwriters". They commenced in 1982.

! 
|-
| rowspan="2"| 2022
| "Get Me Out" (Roy Kellaway & Yirrŋa Yunupiŋu)
| rowspan="2"| Song of the Year
| 
| rowspan="2"| 
|-
| "Milkumana" (Roy Kellaway & Yirrŋa Yunupiŋu)
| 
|-
| 2023
| "Lupa" (Roy Kellaway & Yirrŋa Yunupiŋu)
| Song of the Year 
|  
| 
|-

ARIA Music Awards
The ARIA Music Awards is an annual awards ceremony that recognises excellence, innovation, and achievement across all genres of Australian music.

! 
|-
| rowspan="5"| 2022
| rowspan="4"| King Stingray| Album of the Year
| 
| rowspan="5"| 
|-
| Best Group
| 
|-
| Michael Gudinski Breakthrough Artist
| 
|-
| Best Rock Album
| 
|-
| Kayla Flett, Gabi Coulthurst & Dimathaya Burarrwanga for King Stingray – King Stingray 
| ARIA Award for Best Cover Art
| 
|-

Australian Music Prize
The Australian Music Prize (the AMP) is an annual award of $30,000 given to an Australian band or solo artist in recognition of the merit of an album released during the year of award. It exists to discover, reward and promote new Australian music of excellence.

!  
|-
| 2022
| King Stingray| Australian Music Prize
| 
| 
|-

Environmental Music Prize
The Environmental Music Prize is a quest to find a theme song to inspire action on climate and conservation. It commenced in 2022.

! 
|-
| 2022
| "Hey Wanhaka"
| Environmental Music Prize
| 
| 
|-

J Awards
The J Awards are an annual series of Australian music awards that were established by the Australian Broadcasting Corporation's youth-focused radio station Triple J. They commenced in 2005.

! 
|-
| rowspan="2"| 2021
| "Milkumana" (directed by King Stingray and Sam Brumby)
| Australian Video of the Year
| 
| rowspan="2"| 
|-
| King Stingray
| Unearthed Artist of the Year
| 
|-
| rowspan="2"|  2022
| King Stingray|Australian Album of the Year
| 
| rowspan="2"|  
|-
| King Stingray
| Double J Artist of the Year
| 
|-

National Indigenous Music Awards
The National Indigenous Music Awards recognise excellence, innovation and leadership among Aboriginal and Torres Strait Islander musicians from throughout Australia. They commenced in 2004.

! 
|-
! scope="row" rowspan="1"| 2021
| King Stingray
| New Artist of the Year
| 
| 
|-
! scope="row" rowspan="2"| 2022
| King Stingray
| Artist of the Year
| 
| rowspan="2"| 
|-
| "Milkumana"
| Song of the Year
| 
|-
|}

Rolling Stone Australia Awards
The Rolling Stone Australia Awards are awarded annually in January or February by the Australian edition of Rolling Stone'' magazine for outstanding contributions to popular culture in the previous year.

! 
|-
| 2022
| King Stingray
| Best New Artist
| 
| 
|-

References

2020 establishments in Australia
ARIA Award winners
Australian surf rock groups
Indigenous Australian musical groups
Musical groups established in 2020
Northern Territory musical groups
Yolngu